Kalurghat is located several miles north of the port city of Chittagong, Bangladesh, and is mostly famous for several heavy industries located there. A bridge near Kalurghat on the Karnaphuli River connects Chittagong city with the southern parts of the district.

Kalurghat is also the location of the radio transmitter where Major Ziaur Rahman declared the independence of Bangladesh during the Bangladesh Liberation War in 1971. Using a makeshift radio transmitter located in Kalurghat, first M A Hannan on 26 March 1971 afternoon, and later on 26 March 1971 evening Ziaur Rahman, an army major then, and President of Bangladesh much later, declared the Independence of Bangladesh, on behalf of the Father of the Nation Bangabandhu Sheikh Mujibur Rahman.

The first declaration

A translation into English of the first declaration of independence by M A Hannan on 26 March 1971 is given below:

Zia's declaration

Major Ziaur Rahman's opening words in Bengali, "Ami Major Zia Bolchi", that is, "I am Major Zia speaking", were picked up by news agencies, and were given wide publicity across the globe. Ami Major Zia Bolchi were followed by declaration of a sovereign and independent Bangladesh at 26 March 1971 evening, in these words:

After 27 March he also included the name of Bangabandhu Sheikh Mujibur Rahman in this declaration.

References

External links
 Kalurghat Radio station

Populated places in Chittagong Division
Bangladesh Liberation War